Police (2013) is a crime novel by Norwegian writer Jo Nesbø. It is the tenth novel in Nesbø's Harry Hole series.

Plot
The tenth in the Oslo crime series featuring detective Harry Hole is the most sizeable entry yet; a twisting-turning saga that pits the gangly maverick against that most feared of serial killers, the cop killer. This murderer has a very devious modus operandi, luring police, and ex-police, involved in unsolved murders to the scene of the original crime to perform a copycat killing there, seemingly as a punishment for having failed to solve the original case.

Reference list

External links

Harry Hole (novel series)
Norwegian crime novels
2013 Norwegian novels
21st-century Norwegian novels